Aniket Anil Jadhav (born 13 July 2000) is an Indian professional footballer who plays as a winger for Indian Super League club Odisha and the India national team.

Career
Born in Kolhapur, Maharashtra, Jadhav was part of the AIFF Elite Academy batch that was preparing for the 2017 FIFA U-17 World Cup to be hosted in India. After the tournament, Jadhav was selected to play for the Indian Arrows, an All India Football Federation-owned team that would consist of India under-20 players to give them playing time. He made his professional debut for the side in the Arrow's first match of the season against Chennai City. He started and scored a brace as Indian Arrows won 3–0.

On March 5, 2019, Jadhav joined Blackburn Rovers for a 3 month training spell at their academy.

Jadav joined the ISL side East Bengal from Hyderabad in August 2022. After a small stint, he signed for Odisha in January 2023.

International
Jadhav represented the India under-17 side in the 2017 FIFA U-17 World Cup which was hosted in India.

In March 2022, Jadav was called up for the national squad by coach Igor Štimac ahead of India's two friendly matches against Bahrain and Belarus.

Career statistics

Honour
Hyderabad FC
Indian Super League: 2021–22

References

2000 births
Living people
People from Kolhapur
Footballers from Maharashtra
Indian footballers
India international footballers
Association football forwards
AIFF Elite Academy players
Indian Arrows players
Jamshedpur FC players
I-League players
Indian Super League players
Hyderabad FC players
India youth international footballers